Vamna is a rural locality (a village) in Fominskoye Rural Settlement, Gorokhovetsky District, Vladimir Oblast, Russia. The population was 10 as of 2010.

Geography 
Vamna is located 53 km southwest of Gorokhovets (the district's administrative centre) by road. Taranovo is the nearest rural locality.

References 

Rural localities in Gorokhovetsky District